Franz Jakob may refer to:

Franz Jakob (politician) (1891–1965), German Nazi politician
Franz G. Jacob (1870–?), German chess player
Franz Jakob (bobsleigh) (1949–), Austrian bobsledder